Akamasia is a monotypic genus of spiders in the family Zoropsidae. It was first described by Bosselaers in 2002. , it contains only one species, Akamasia cyprogenia, found in Cyprus.

References

Zoropsidae
Monotypic Araneomorphae genera